The Scout and Guide movement in Aruba is served by
 Het Arubaanse Padvindsters Gilde, member of the World Association of Girl Guides and Girl Scouts
 Scouting Aruba, member of the World Organization of the Scout Movement
 Seal Scouting Aruba
 Antilliaans Jongens & Meisjes Gilde district Aruba

References

See also